Rahela Raheela Perveen is a Pakistani politician who had been a member of the National Assembly of Pakistan from 2008 to 2013.

Political career
She was elected to the National Assembly of Pakistan from Constituency NA-78 (Faisalabad-IV) as a candidate of Pakistan Peoples Party (PPP) in 2008 Pakistani general election. He received 79,127 votes and defeated Rajab Ali Khan Baloch.

In June 2012, she was inducted into the federal cabinet of Prime Minister Raja Pervaiz Ashraf and was appointed as Minister of State for Science and Technology where she continued to serve until March 2013.

References

Living people
Pakistani MNAs 2008–2013
Year of birth missing (living people)